Vahdatiyeh Rural District is in Sadabad District of Dashtestan County, Bushehr province, Iran. At the census of 2006, its population was 2,120 in 450 households; there were 1,717 inhabitants in 428 households at the following census of 2011; and in the most recent census of 2016, the population of the rural district was 1,724 in 473 households. The largest of its 20 villages was Sarqanat, with 1,052 people.

References 

Rural Districts of Bushehr Province
Populated places in Dashtestan County